The 1995 Maine Black Bears football team was an American football team that represented the University of Maine as a member of the Yankee Conference during the 1995 NCAA Division I-AA football season. In their third season under head coach Jack Cosgrove, the Black Bears compiled a 3–8 record (1–7 against conference opponents) and tied for last place in the New England Division of the Yankee Conference. Ray Bauer, Brian Gaine, and Joe Robinson were the team captains.

Schedule

References

Maine
Maine Black Bears football seasons
Maine Black Bears football